is a Japanese voice actor and singer. On leading roles, he played Yoshimori Sumimura in Kekkaishi, Yuji Kagura in Tona-Gura!, Takumi Nishijō in Chaos;Head, Yusuke "Bossun" Fujisaki in Sket Dance, Meow in Space Dandy, Favaro in Rage of Bahamut: Genesis and Galina in Yatterman Night. On supporting roles, he played Bernard Firestar in Divergence Eve, Chrome in Cluster Edge, Debito in La storia della Arcana Famiglia, Natsuki Minami in Minami-ke, Allelujah Haptism in Mobile Suit Gundam 00, Yuto Kido in Inazuma Eleven, Rin Hirakoba in The Prince of Tennis, Kenichi Saruyama in To Love Ru, Hajime Iwaizumi in Haikyuu!!, Houka Inumuta in Kill la Kill, Hizashi Yamada in My Hero Academia and Yasutumo Arakita in Yowamushi Pedal.

On August 3, 2021, it was announced that Yoshino had tested positive for COVID-19.

Filmography

Animation

Film

Live action

Video games

Drama recordings

Dubbing roles

Live action

Animation

Other dubbing
"Miracle Train ~Chūō-sen e Yōkoso~" – Zero Tokyo – Train station promotional character

Discography

Singles

Mini-albums

References

External links
Kiramune profile 

 

1974 births
Living people
Male voice actors from Chiba Prefecture
Japanese male pop singers
Japanese male video game actors
Japanese male voice actors
Lantis (company) artists
Musicians from Chiba Prefecture
20th-century Japanese male actors
21st-century Japanese male actors
21st-century Japanese singers
Sigma Seven voice actors
21st-century Japanese male singers